Louisiana Correctional Institute for Women (LCIW) is a prison for women with its permanent pre-2016 facility located in St. Gabriel, Louisiana. It is the only female correctional facility of the Louisiana Department of Public Safety and Corrections. Elayn Hunt Correctional Center is immediately west of LCIW. LCIW includes the state's female death row.  the prison has temporarily moved due to flooding that occurred in August 2016, and its prisoners are housed in other prisons. The administration is temporarily located in the former Jetson Youth Center near Baker.   By 2021 the Baker area address was given for the prison on the LCIW website.

History
In 1961 the Louisiana Correctional Institute for Women opened on the grounds of a former prison farm camp. Female inmates were moved from the Louisiana State Penitentiary (Angola) to LCIW. A 200 bed dormitory intended to alleviate an overcrowding of female prisoners was scheduled to open in the northern hemisphere spring of 1995. In 1995 the state received federal approval for its plan to double-bunk inmates. That way the state could transfer state-sentenced female prisoners who were held in parish jails to the women's prison. The television special 900 Women: Inside St. Gabriel's Prison is about the women inside the facility.

2016 flooding
In August 2016 the facility, which had 985 prisoners, experienced flooding, ranging from  
LCIW, the only state-operated prison to receive flooding during that incident, temporarily closed. It was the first time in state history that the whole population of a particular prison was evacuated to other facilities. The chapel and one other building did not flood.

LCIW prisoners were immediately transferred to the former C. Paul Phelps Correctional Center a facility near DeQuincy, which received 678 prisoners; the private Louisiana Transitional Center for Women in Tallulah, which received 221 prisoners; Avoyelles Parish Jail in Marksville, which received 47 prisoners; and Angola, which received 39 prisoners. By September the prisoners housed near DeQuincy were transferred to the former Jetson Youth Center, a youth prison near Baker which closed in 2014.  the prisoners are divided between Jetson, where the administration of LCIW is temporarily located; Angola; and Elayn Hunt.

 the prison remained closed as the Federal Emergency Management Agency (FEMA) had not yet determined how much of the facility sustained damage; once this is done the state plans to raze the flooded buildings as it determined that demolition is more cost effective. The new prison will cost about $100 million, with $36.2 million provided by FEMA.

In 2020 the COVID-19 pandemic in Louisiana affected various temporary facilities housing LCIW prisoners, many of which were more cramped than the previous LCIW prison.

Facility
The pre-2016 prison had two per room prison cells as the form. Prison toilets and showers had individual stalls.

Demographics
As of circa the 2010s the prison has about 1,100 prisoners. 80% of the prisoners had children. Only 126 of the prisoners had sentences of six or fewer years, 126 had life sentences, and two had death sentences. Many prisoners were convicted of drug use and/or of prostitution, as Louisiana law treats prostitution as a sexual offense.

Programs
The prison has the Program for Caring Parents and the Christmas Extravaganza, and in 2016 women were allowed to participate in some programs offered by Hunt Correctional Center.

Notable inmates
Death row
 Antoinette Frank - Former police officer with the New Orleans Police Department (NOPD), who was charged and convicted of three counts of first-degree murder. Sentenced to death.

Non-death row:
 Amy Hebert - Convicted of murdering her two children. She was held at LCIW as a pretrial inmate since Lafourche Parish lacked adequate facilities for female inmates who needed medical care, and she remained at LCIW as a sentenced felon.  she was held at the Jetson facility.

See also

References

Further reading

External links
 "Louisiana Correctional Institute for Women." Louisiana Department of Public Safety and Corrections
 "08-406 Corrections Services - Louisiana Correctional Institute for Women." (Archive)

Prisons in Louisiana
Capital punishment in Louisiana
Buildings and structures in Iberville Parish, Louisiana
Women's prisons in Louisiana
Government agencies established in 1961
1961 establishments in Louisiana